Christopher Biggs (born 25 March 1979) is a South African cricketer. He played in four first-class matches for Eastern Province in 1998/99.

See also
 List of Eastern Province representative cricketers

References

External links
 

1979 births
Living people
South African cricketers
Eastern Province cricketers
Cricketers from Port Elizabeth